Kang Min-hyeok or Kang Min-hyok may refer to:
 Gang Min-hyeok (born 1981), South Korean skier
 Kang Min-hyuk (footballer) (born 1982), South Korean footballer
 Kang Min-hyuk (born 1991), South Korean singer and actor
 Kang Min-hyuk (badminton) (born 1999), South Korean badminton player